Olga Harmony (April 23, 1928 – November 11, 2018) was a Mexican playwright and a drama teacher at the Escuela Nacional Preparatoria.

References

1928 births
2018 deaths
Writers from Mexico City
National Autonomous University of Mexico alumni
Mexican women dramatists and playwrights